2014–15 Saudi First Division was the 38th season of Saudi First Division since its establishment in 1976.

The season featured 11 teams from the 2013–14 campaign, two new teams relegated from the 2013–14 Professional League: Al-Ettifaq and Al-Nahda, and three new teams promoted from the 2013–14 Saudi Second Division: Al-Feiha as champions and group B winner, Al-Safa as runners-up and group A winner and Al-Mojzel as Third-place play-offs winner. The league began on 15 August 2014 and was ended on 20 April 2015.

Al-Qadisiyah won the title and promoted to 2015–16 Professional League plus Al-Wehda as runners-up. Al-Safa, Abha and Hetten were relegated to 2015–16 Saudi Second Division.

Teams

Teams relegated from the 2013–14 Professional League
 Al-Ettifaq
 Al-Nahda

Teams promoted from the 2013–14 Saudi Second Division
Al-Feiha
Al-Safa
Al-Mojzel

League table

See also
 Saudi Pro League 2014–15
 Saudi King's Cup 2014–15
 Saudi Crown Prince Cup 2014–15
 Saudi Super Cup

References

External links
 Saudi Arabia Football Federation
 Saudi League Statistics
 goalzz

Saudi First Division League seasons
Saudi
2014–15 in Saudi Arabian football